Giles of Lessines OP (died ) was a thirteenth-century Dominican scholastic philosopher, a pupil of Thomas Aquinas. He was also strongly influenced by Albertus Magnus. He was an early defender of Thomism.

He is also known as an early scientist, and for economic theory, writing on usury and market prices.

Works
Among the works authored by Giles are:
Commentarium in libros I et II Sententiarum
De concordia temporum
De essentia, motu et significatione cometarum
De geometria
Epistula Alberto Magno missa
Summa de temporibus
De unitate formae
De usuris
Quaestiones theologicae

Notes

1300s deaths
Year of birth unknown

Year of death uncertain
Scholastic philosophers

Members of the Dominican Order
County of Hainaut
13th-century Roman Catholic priests
14th-century Roman Catholic priests
13th-century Roman Catholic theologians
13th-century philosophers